Mariatu Kamara (born 25 May 1986 in Yonkro, Sierra Leone) is a UNICEF Special Representative, author and survivor of the civil war in Sierra Leone.

Early life

Mariautu Kamara was raised in the small village of Magborou in the West African country of Sierra Leone. Her mother, Aminatu, was the second wife of her father, the first being Sampa; she was thus raised in a polygamous household. At a very young age, she was sent to live with her father's sister, Marie and her husband, Alie.

Experiences during the war
As a 12-year-old child during the civil war in Sierra Leone, Kamara was raped by a male family friend named Salieu; Salieu, whom she was under pressure to marry when she reached the age of 16, was a trusted friend of her aunt Marie. Shortly after the rape, the village was invaded by Revolutionary United Front rebels, who cut off both of her hands. During the attacks she witnessed the murder of many members of her own family and friends, as well as her rapist Salieu, but she managed to escape. She made her way to the Connaught Hospital in Freetown (along the way she was helped by several strangers), where surgery was performed on her arms to prevent infection. There, she discovered that she had become pregnant during the rape.

After being released from the hospital, Mariatu spent many years begging for money while living at the crowded Aberdeen Amputee Camp. She also became part of a theater group at the camp, and along with many other amputees her age, was able to raise awareness of her country's problems by performing and dancing. She was then given the chance to get prosthetics and was sent to London. Thanks to a UNICEF sponsorship, she was able to move to Canada where she has toured with Free the Children (now WE) and UNICEF to promote equal rights as well as education.

Life 
In 2008, Kamara wrote a book about her experiences during the war, in collaboration with Canadian journalist Susan McClelland. The book was entitled The Bite of the Mango.
In 2022, a Canadian film called "Bite of a Mango" was released. It stars Jayne Kamara who is Kamara's relative, however the movie title is just to pay homage but has no relation towards her book "The Bite of the Mango".

References

Cited works

External links 
 The Bite of the Mango, by Mariatu Kamara and Susan McClelland, at Google Books

Living people
UNICEF Goodwill Ambassadors
Sierra Leonean women writers
1986 births
21st-century women writers
Sierra Leonean amputees